"Let's Take the Long Way Around the World" is a song written by Archie Jordan and Naomi Martin, and recorded by American country music artist Ronnie Milsap.  It was released in September 1978 as the second single from the album Only One Love in My Life.  The song was Milsap's eleventh number one on the country charts.  The single stayed at number one for a single week and spent ten weeks on the chart.  In 1979, Kenny Rogers and Dottie West recorded this song as a duet.  The recording was not released as a single.  The album is titled "Classics".

Chart performance

References

1978 singles
1978 songs
Ronnie Milsap songs
RCA Records singles
Songs written by Archie Jordan
Song recordings produced by Tom Collins (record producer)